Stara Maszyna  is a village in the administrative district of Gmina Sierakowice, within Kartuzy County, Pomeranian Voivodeship, in northern Poland. Kashubian vetch (Vicia cassubica) is native to the village.

For details of the history of the region, see History of Pomerania.

The village has a population of 138.

References

Stara Maszyna